The decompression of a diver is the reduction in ambient pressure experienced during ascent from depth.  It is also the process of elimination of dissolved inert gases from the diver's body, which occurs during the ascent, largely during pauses in the ascent known as decompression stops, and after surfacing, until the gas concentrations reach equilibrium. Divers breathing gas at ambient pressure need to ascend at a rate determined by their exposure to pressure and the breathing gas in use.  A diver who only breathes gas at atmospheric pressure when free-diving or snorkelling will not usually need to decompress, Divers using an atmospheric diving suit do not need to decompress as they are never exposed to high ambient pressure.

When a diver descends in the water, the hydrostatic pressure, and therefore the ambient pressure, rises. Because breathing gas is supplied at ambient pressure, some of this gas dissolves into the diver's blood and is transferred by the blood to other tissues. Inert gas such as nitrogen or helium continues to be taken up until the gas dissolved in the diver is in a state of equilibrium with the breathing gas in the diver's lungs, at which point the diver is saturated for that depth and breathing mixture, or the depth, and therefore the pressure, is changed, or the partial pressures of the gases are changed by modifying the breathing gas mixture.  During ascent, the ambient pressure is reduced, and at some stage the inert gases dissolved in any given tissue will be at a higher concentration than the equilibrium state and start to diffuse out again. If the pressure reduction is sufficient, excess gas may form bubbles, which may lead to decompression sickness, a possibly debilitating or life-threatening condition. It is essential that divers manage their decompression to avoid excessive bubble formation and decompression sickness.  A mismanaged decompression usually results from reducing the ambient pressure too quickly for the amount of gas in solution to be eliminated safely.  These bubbles may block arterial blood supply to tissues or directly cause tissue damage.  If the decompression is effective, the asymptomatic venous microbubbles present after most dives are eliminated from the diver's body in the alveolar capillary beds of the lungs. If they are not given enough time, or more bubbles are created than can be eliminated safely, the bubbles grow in size and number causing the symptoms and injuries of decompression sickness. The immediate goal of controlled decompression is to avoid development of symptoms of bubble formation in the tissues of the diver, and the long-term goal is to avoid complications due to sub-clinical decompression injury.

The mechanisms of bubble formation and the damage bubbles cause has been the subject of medical research for a considerable time and several hypotheses have been advanced and tested. Tables and algorithms for predicting the outcome of decompression schedules for specified hyperbaric exposures have been proposed, tested and used, and in many cases, superseded. Although constantly refined and generally considered acceptably reliable, the actual outcome for any individual diver remains slightly unpredictable. Although decompression retains some risk, this is now generally considered acceptable for dives within the well tested range of normal recreational and professional diving.

Decompression may be continuous or staged.  A staged decompression ascent is interrupted by decompression stops at calculated depth intervals, but the entire ascent is actually part of the decompression and the ascent rate is critical to harmless elimination of inert gas. A no-decompression dive, or more accurately, a dive with no-stop decompression, relies on limiting the ascent rate for avoidance of excessive bubble formation in the fastest tissues. The elapsed time at surface pressure immediately after a dive is also an important part of decompression and can be thought of as the last decompression stop of a dive. It can take up to 24 hours for the body to return to its normal atmospheric levels of inert gas saturation after a dive. When time is spent on the surface between dives this is known as the "surface interval" and is considered when calculating decompression requirements for the subsequent dive.

Efficient decompression requires the diver to ascend fast enough to establish as high a decompression gradient, in as many tissues, as safely possible, without provoking the development of symptomatic bubbles. This is facilitated by the highest acceptably safe oxygen partial pressure in the breathing gas, and avoiding gas changes that could cause counterdiffusion bubble formation or growth. The development of schedules that are both safe and efficient has been complicated by the large number of variables and uncertainties, including personal variation in response under varying environmental conditions and workload.

Decompression theory 

Decompression theory is the study and modelling of the transfer of the inert gas component of breathing gases from the gas in the lungs to the tissues of the diver and back during exposure to variations in ambient pressure. In the case of underwater diving and compressed air work, this mostly involves ambient pressures greater than the local surface pressure—but astronauts, high altitude mountaineers, and occupants of unpressurised aircraft, are exposed to ambient pressures less than standard sea level atmospheric pressure. In all cases, the symptoms of decompression sickness occur during or within a relatively short period of hours, or occasionally days, after a significant reduction of ambient pressure.

Physics and physiology of decompression 
 
The absorption of gases in liquids depends on the solubility of the specific gas in the specific liquid, the concentration of gas, customarily expressed as partial pressure, and temperature. The main variable in the study of decompression theory is pressure.

Once dissolved, distribution of the dissolved gas may be by diffusion, where there is no bulk flow of the solvent, or by perfusion where the solvent (in this case blood) is circulated around the diver's body, where gas can diffuse to local regions of lower concentration. Given sufficient time at a specific partial pressure in the breathing gas, the concentration in the tissues stabilises, or saturates, at a rate that depends on solubility, diffusion rate and perfusion, all of which vary in the different tissues of the body. This process is referred to as in-gassing, and is usually modelled as an inverse exponential process.

If the concentration of the inert gas in the breathing gas is reduced below that of any of the tissues, there is a tendency for gas to return from the tissues to the breathing gas. This is known as out-gassing, and occurs during decompression, when the reduction in ambient pressure reduces the partial pressure of the inert gas in the lungs. This process may be complicated by the formation of gas bubbles, and the modelling is more complex and varied.

The combined concentrations of gases in any given tissue depend on the history of pressure and gas composition. Under equilibrium conditions, the total concentration of dissolved gases is less than the ambient pressure—as oxygen is metabolised in the tissues, and the carbon dioxide produced is much more soluble. However, during a reduction in ambient pressure, the rate of pressure reduction may exceed the rate at which gas is eliminated by diffusion and perfusion. If the concentration gets too high, it may reach a stage where bubble formation can occur in the supersaturated tissues. When the pressure of gases in a bubble exceed the combined external pressures of ambient pressure and the surface tension of the bubble-liquid interface, the bubbles grow, and this growth can damage tissue.

If the dissolved inert gases come out of solution within the tissues of the body and form bubbles, they may cause the condition known as decompression sickness, or DCS, also known as divers' disease, the bends or caisson disease. However, not all bubbles result in symptoms, and Doppler bubble detection shows that venous bubbles are present in a significant number of asymptomatic divers after relatively mild hyperbaric exposures.

Since bubbles can form in or migrate to any part of the body, DCS can produce many symptoms, and its effects may vary from joint pain and rashes to paralysis and death. Individual susceptibility can vary from day to day, and different individuals under the same conditions may be affected differently or not at all. The classification of types of DCS by its symptoms has evolved since its original description.

The risk of decompression sickness after diving can be managed through effective decompression procedures and contracting it is now uncommon, though it remains to some degree unpredictable. Its potential severity has driven much research to prevent it and divers almost universally use decompression tables or dive computers to limit or monitor their exposure and to control their ascent speed and decompression procedures. If DCS is contracted, it is usually treated by hyperbaric oxygen therapy in a recompression chamber. If treated early, there is a significantly higher chance of successful recovery.

A diver who only breathes gas at atmospheric pressure when free-diving or snorkelling will not usually need to decompress but it is possible to get decompression sickness, or taravana, from repetitive deep free-diving with short surface intervals.

Decompression models 
 
Actual rates of diffusion and perfusion, and solubility of gases in specific physiological tissues are not generally known, and vary considerably. However mathematical models have been proposed that approximate the real situation to a greater or lesser extent. These models predict whether symptomatic bubble formation is likely to occur for a given dive profile. Algorithms based on these models produce decompression tables. In personal dive computers, they produce a real-time estimate of decompression status and display a recommended ascent profile for the diver, which may include decompression stops.

Two different concepts have been used for decompression modelling. The first assumes that dissolved gas is eliminated while in the dissolved phase, and that bubbles are not formed during asymptomatic decompression. The second, which is supported by experimental observation, assumes that bubbles are formed during most asymptomatic decompressions, and that gas elimination must consider both dissolved and bubble phases.

Early decompression models tended to use the dissolved phase models, and adjusted them by factors derived from experimental observations to reduce the risk of symptomatic bubble formation.

There are two main groups of dissolved phase models: In parallel compartment models, several compartments with varying rates of gas absorption (half time), are considered to exist independently of each other, and the limiting condition is controlled by the compartment that shows the worst case for a specific exposure profile. These compartments represent conceptual tissues and don't represent specific organic tissues. They merely represent the range of possibilities for the organic tissues. The second group uses serial compartments, which assumes that gas diffuses through one compartment before it reaches the next.

More recent models attempt to model bubble dynamics, also usually by simplified models, to facilitate the computation of tables, and later to allow real time predictions during a dive. Models that approximate bubble dynamics are varied. They range from those that are not much more complex than the dissolved phase models, to those that require considerably greater computational power. Bubble models have not been experimentally shown to be more efficient, nor to reduce risk of decompression sickness for dives where the bottom profile and total ascent time are the same as for dissolved gas models. Limited experimental work suggests that for some dive profiles the increased ingassing due to deeper stops may cause greater decompression stress in slower tissues with consequent greater venous bubble loading after dives.

Decompression practice 

The practice of decompression by divers comprises the planning and monitoring of the profile indicated by the algorithms or tables of the chosen decompression model, the equipment available and appropriate to the circumstances of the dive, and the procedures authorised for the equipment and profile to be used. There is a large range of options in all of these aspects. In many cases decompression practice takes place in a framework or "decompression system" which imposes extra constraints on diver behaviour. Such constraints may include: limiting the ascent rate; making stops during the ascent additional to any decompression stops; limiting the number of dives performed in a day; limiting the number of days of diving within a week; avoiding dive profiles that have large numbers of ascents and descents; avoiding heavy work immediately after a dive; not diving prior to flying or ascending to altitude; and organisational requirements.

Procedures 

Decompression may be continuous or staged, where the ascent is interrupted by stops at regular depth intervals, but the entire ascent is part of the decompression, and ascent rate can be critical to harmless elimination of inert gas. What is commonly known as no-decompression diving, or more accurately no-stop decompression, relies on limiting ascent rate for avoidance of excessive bubble formation.

The procedures used for decompression depend on the mode of diving, the available equipment, the site and environment and the actual dive profile. Standardised procedures have been developed that provide an acceptable level of risk in appropriate circumstances. Different sets of procedures are used by commercial, military, scientific and recreational divers, though there is considerable overlap where similar equipment is used, and some concepts are common to all decompression procedures.

Normal diving decompression procedures range from continuous ascent for no-stop dives, where the necessary decompression occurs during the ascent, which is kept to a controlled rate for this purpose, through staged decompression in open water or in a bell, or following the decompression ceiling, to decompression from saturation, which generally occurs in a decompression chamber that is part of a saturation system. Decompression may be accelerated by the use of breathing gases that provide an increased concentration differential of the inert gas components of the breathing mixture by maximising the acceptable oxygen content, while avoiding problems caused by inert gas counterdiffusion.

Therapeutic recompression is a medical procedure for treatment of decompression sickness, and is followed by decompression, usually to a relatively conservative schedule.

Equipment 

Equipment directly associated with decompression includes:
 The decompression tables or software used to plan the dive,
 The equipment used to control and monitor depth and dive time, such as:
 personal dive computers, depth gauges, and timers,
 Shot lines, surface marker buoys (SMBs), Decompression buoys (DSMBs) and decompression trapezes
 diving stages (baskets), wet and dry bells,
 deck and saturation decompression chambers, and
 hyperbaric treatment chambers.
 The supply of decompression gases, which may be:
 carried by the diver,
 supplied from the surface via the diver's umbilical or bell umbilical, or
 supplied in the chamber at the surface.

History of decompression research and development 

The symptoms of decompression sickness are caused by damage from the formation and growth of bubbles of inert gas within the tissues and by blockage of arterial blood supply to tissues by gas bubbles and other emboli consequential to bubble formation and tissue damage.

The precise mechanisms of bubble formation and the damage they cause has been the subject of medical research for a considerable time and several hypotheses have been advanced and tested. Tables and algorithms for predicting the outcome of decompression schedules for specified hyperbaric exposures have been proposed, tested, and used, and usually found to be of some use but not entirely reliable. Decompression remains a procedure with some risk, but this has been reduced and is generally considered acceptable for dives within the well-tested range of commercial, military and recreational diving.

Early developments 
The first recorded experimental work related to decompression was conducted by Robert Boyle, who subjected experimental animals to reduced ambient pressure by use of a primitive vacuum pump. In the earliest experiments the subjects died from asphyxiation, but in later experiments signs of what was later to become known as decompression sickness were observed.

Later, when technological advances allowed the use of pressurisation of mines and caissons to exclude water ingress, miners were observed to present symptoms of what would become known as caisson disease, compressed air illness, the bends, and decompression sickness.

Once it was recognised that the symptoms were caused by gas bubbles, and that re-compression could relieve the symptoms, Paul Bert showed in 1878 that decompression sickness is caused by nitrogen bubbles released from tissues and blood during or after decompression, and showed the advantages of breathing oxygen after developing decompression sickness.

Further work showed that it was possible to avoid symptoms by slow decompression, and subsequently various theoretical models have been derived to predict safe decompression profiles and treatment of decompression sickness.

Start of systematic work on decompression models 
In 1908 John Scott Haldane prepared the first recognized decompression table for the British Admiralty, based on extensive experiments on goats using an end point of symptomatic DCS.

George D. Stillson of the United States Navy tested and refined Haldane's tables in 1912, and this research led to the first publication of the United States Navy Diving Manual and the establishment of a Navy Diving School in Newport, Rhode Island. At about the same time Leonard Erskine Hill was working on a system of continuous uniform decompression

The Naval School, Diving and Salvage was re-established at the Washington Navy Yard in 1927, and the Navy Experimental Diving Unit (NEDU) was moved to the same venue. In the following years, the Experimental Diving Unit developed the US Navy Air Decompression Tables, which became the accepted world standard for diving with compressed air.

During the 1930s, Hawkins, Schilling and Hansen conducted extensive experimental dives to determine allowable supersaturation ratios for different tissue compartments for Haldanean model, Albert R. Behnke and others experimented with oxygen for re-compression therapy, and the US Navy 1937 tables were published.

In 1941, altitude decompression sickness was first treated with hyperbaric oxygen. and the revised US Navy Decompression Tables were published in 1956.

Beginnings of alternative models 
In 1965 LeMessurier and Hills published A thermodynamic approach arising from a study on Torres Strait diving techniques, which suggests that decompression by conventional models forms bubbles that are then eliminated by re-dissolving at the decompression stops—which is slower than elimination while still in solution. This indicates the importance of minimizing bubble phase for efficient gas elimination, Groupe d'Etudes et Recherches Sous-marines published the French Navy MN65 decompression tables, and Goodman and Workman introduced re-compression tables using oxygen to accelerate elimination of inert gas.

The Royal Navy Physiological Laboratory published tables based on Hempleman's tissue slab diffusion model in 1972, isobaric counterdiffusion in subjects who breathed one inert gas mixture while being surrounded by another was first described by Graves, Idicula, Lambertsen, and Quinn in 1973, and the French government published the MT74 Tables du Ministère du Travail in 1974.

From 1976, decompression sickness testing sensitivity was improved by ultrasonic methods that can detect mobile venous bubbles before symptoms of DCS become apparent.

Development of several additional approaches 
Paul K Weathersby, Louis D Homer and Edward T Flynn introduced survival analysis into the study of decompression sickness in 1982.

Albert A. Bühlmann published Decompression–Decompression sickness in 1984. Bühlmann recognised the problems associated with altitude diving, and proposed a method that calculated maximum nitrogen loading in the tissues at a particular ambient pressure by modifying Haldane's allowable supersaturation ratios to increase linearly with depth.
In 1984 DCIEM (Defence and Civil Institution of Environmental Medicine, Canada) released No-Decompression and Decompression Tables based on the Kidd/Stubbs serial compartment model and extensive ultrasonic testing, and Edward D. Thalmann published the USN E-L algorithm and tables for constant PO2 Nitrox closed circuit rebreather applications, and extended use of the E-L model for constant PO2 Heliox CCR in 1985. The E-L model may be interpreted as a bubble model.
The 1986 Swiss Sport Diving Tables were based on the Haldanean Bühlmann model, as were the 1987 SAA Bühlmann tables in the UK.

Bubble models started to become prevalent 
D. E. Yount and D. C. Hoffman proposed a bubble model in 1986, and the BSAC'88 tables were based on Hennessy's bubble model.

The 1990 DCIEM sport diving tables were based on fitting experimental data, rather than a physiological model, and the 1990 French Navy Marine Nationale 90 (MN90) decompression tables were a development of the earlier Haldanean model of the MN65 tables.

In 1991 D.E. Yount described a development of his earlier bubble model, the Varied Permeability Model, and the 1992 French civilian Tables du Ministère du Travail (MT92) also have a bubble model interpretation.

NAUI published Trimix and Nitrox tables based on the Wienke reduced gradient bubble model (RGBM) in 1999, followed by recreational air tables based on the RGBM model in 2001.

In 2007, Wayne Gerth and David Doolette published VVal 18 and VVal 18M parameter sets for tables and programs based on the Thalmann E-L algorithm, and produced an internally compatible set of decompression tables for open circuit and CCR on air and Nitrox, including in water air/oxygen decompression and surface decompression on oxygen. In 2008, the US Navy Diving Manual Revision 6 included a version of the 2007 tables developed by Gerth and Doolette.

See also 
 
 
 
  
  
  
 
  
  
 Decompression models:

References

Sources

Further reading 
 Gribble, M. de G. (1960); "A Comparison of the High-Altitude and High-Pressure Syndromes of Decompression Sickness", Br. J. Ind. Med., 1960, 17, 181.
 Hills. B. (1966); A Thermodynamic and Kinetic Approach to Decompression Sickness. Thesis.

External links

Dive tables from the NOAA
German BGV C 23 table, permitting a simplified procedure of decompression planning

 
Decompression equipment